Derrick Starks (born November 27, 1970) is an American gospel musician and organist. He started his music career, in 1994, with the release of, Derrick Starks and Today's Generation, that was released by Aaron Records. His second album, He's on Time, was released by Crystal Rose Records in 1999. The third album, Sacrifice, was released in 2001 by Crystal Rose Records. His third album was his breakthrough released upon the Billboard magazine Gospel Albums chart.

Early life
Starks was born on November 27, 1970 in Detroit, Michigan, to father, Reverend C.J. Starks, of Prayer Tabernacle Church, and his homemaker mother, Dorothy. He has four other siblings. His father purchased an organ, at Christmas, and he learned how to play the organ, which facilitated him becoming an organist to further his musical pursuits. Thomas Whitfield used Starks organ-playing acumen at Hartford Memorial Church, which occurred in 1988.

Music career
He formed Today's Generation from members of his church choir in 1991, yet their first album did not release until 1994, with Aaron Records, Derrick Starks and Today's Generation, yet this failed to chart. His second album, He's on Time, was released on June 8, 1999 by Crystal Rose Records, which again this did not chart, and AllMusic rated the album three stars out of five. The third album, Sacrifice, was released by Crystal Rose Records on August 28, 2001, and this charted on the Billboard magazine Top Gospel Albums chart at No. 5. Again AllMusic rated the album three out of five stars.

Discography

References

1970 births
Living people
African-American songwriters
African-American Christians
Musicians from Detroit
Songwriters from Michigan
21st-century African-American people
20th-century African-American people